The 1985 Tour du Haut Var was the 17th edition of the Tour du Haut Var cycle race and was held on 24 February 1985. The race started in Draguignan and finished in Seillans. The race was won by Charly Mottet.

General classification

References

1985
1985 in road cycling
1985 in French sport